Safer at Home is a 2021 American thriller film written by Will Wernick and Lia Bozonelis, and directed by Wernick. The film stars Jocelyn Hudon, Emma Lahana, Alisa Allapach, Adwin Brown and Dan J. Johnson.

Plot
Set in the fall of 2022, after the second and third strains of COVID-19 have extended the COVID-19 pandemic death toll to over 31 million in the United States, mass chaos in Los Angeles has turned the city into a police state. Three sets of couplesBen and Liam in New York City, Evan and Jen in West Hollywood, and Oliver and Mia in Los Angeles' Venice neighborhoodare joined by friend Harper in Austin, Texas, on a four way online birthday party for Evan via Zoom. The group agrees to take a designer drug that Oliver has had delivered to each home. After taking the pill, during a brief verbal argument, Jen falls backward, hits her head and appears to be dead.

As the drugs take a firm hold on the friends, their decision making skills are severely hampered. Fearing that the authorities will think Evan killed her (they themselves are unsure, as none were paying attention to their screens when Jen tripped), the friends help Evan run when a neighbor calls the police. As Oliver drives cross town to Evan, Harper shares that Jen had secretly told her she was pregnant, and planned to tell Evan after the party. Evan reaches his own car and heads for Oliver's, and the group is stunned to see how the pandemic has caused the conditions to deteriorate on the streets of Los Angeles, including military roadblocks.

With Evan having broken the strict curfew, the police escalate a search for him. When the police search Oliver's house, Evan leaves in Oliver's car. Mia convinces Oliver that she should contact her abusive ex-boyfriend, who is a top criminal lawyer. He advises Evan to drive to the Hollywood police station and wait for Danny to arrive, and to say nothing until he gets there. However, he is pulled over by the police before he arrives. Unable to think clearly, and ignoring the advice of Danny and all his friends, Evan disobeys the police orders and gets out of the car, raising his hands with his Zoom enabled phone, leading to Evan being shot.

As Evan lays dying on the street, the feed from Evan and Jen's house shows her regain consciousness and sit up. She and Evan speak of the baby and their love for each other. Evan dies, witnessed by all the friends. Jen screams in agony, as the news radio show in Oliver's car relays that Evan's death is dwarfed by the 2 million Covid deaths that day, bringing the death toll to 253 million, with the United Kingdom becoming the seventh major superpower to cease to exist as a coherent nation.

Cast

 Jocelyn Hudon as Jen
 Alisa Allapach as Harper
 Dan J. Johnson as Evan
 Adwin Brown as Ben
 Daniel Robaire as Liam
 Emma Lahana as Mia
 Michael Kupisk as Oliver

Production
The film was produced by Bo Youngblood and John Ierardi of Showdown Productions, and Will Wernick under his 7930 Entertainment banner.

Release
Voltage Pictures sold the distribution rights to the film in the United States to Vertical Entertainment, which release in limited theatres and for VOD platforms on February 26, 2021.

Reception

On Rotten Tomatoes, the film has a 7% approval rating, based on 14 reviews, with an average rating of 3.7/10. On Metacritic, the film has a weighted average score of 35 out of 100 based on 5 critics indicating "mixed or average reviews".

References

External links
 

2021 thriller films
American thriller films
Films about the COVID-19 pandemic
Films set in 2022
Films set in Los Angeles
Films shot in Los Angeles
Voltage Pictures films
Screenlife films
2020s English-language films
2020s American films